The 1990 PBA season was the 16th season of the Philippine Basketball Association (PBA).

Board of governors

Executive committee
 Rudy Salud (Commissioner)
 Rey Marquez (Chairman, representing Formula Shell Zoom Masters)
 Wilfred Steven Uytengsu, representing Alaska Milkmen)
 Lance Gokongwei (Treasurer, representing Presto Tivolis)

Teams

Season highlights
The PBA increased its membership from 6 to 8 teams, with the entry of expansion franchises RFM/Cosmos Bottling, Inc. and Pepsi-Cola. The 6 regular PBA ballclubs were allowed to protect 9 players from its rosters, the two new teams will pick those players in the expansion pool. 
Formula Shell won their first PBA title after five years of participation, but the biggest story of the year was the walkout of Añejo Rum 65 in Game 6 of the First Conference finals, the 65ers were heavily fined a total of P550,000.
Presto Tivolis won the All-Filipino crown at the expense of Purefoods Hotdogs for their first title in three years and sixth overall.
With the advent of "Open basketball" being approved, professional basketball players are now allowed to play in the international tournaments such as the Olympics and World championships, the PBA send an all-pro team to the Beijing Asian Games in September and chosen to coach the PBA-backed national team is Añejo playing coach Robert Jaworski.  Despite only two weeks to prepare and injuries and problems hounding the team even from the time it was formed, the All-Pro nationals won a silver medal finish, behind host China.
Purefoods Hotdogs came back from a 0-2 overhaul to win the Third Conference title and their first championship with a 3-2 series win over Alaska Milk, becoming only the second team to have won three straight after falling behind two games to none, the Hotdogs duplicated the feat achieved by the Crispa Redmanizers in 1976. Coach Baby Dalupan, the league's winningest coach, won his 15th title.

Opening ceremonies
The muses for the participating teams are as follows:

Champions
 First Conference: Formula Shell Zoom Masters
 All-Filipino Conference: Presto Tivolis
 Third Conference: Purefoods Hotdogs
 Team with best win–loss percentage: Formula Shell Zoom Masters (35-21, .625)
 Best Team of the Year: Purefoods Hotdogs (1st)

First Conference

Elimination round

Semifinal round

Third place playoffs 

|}

Finals

|}
Best Import of the Conference: Bobby Parks (Shell)

All-Filipino Conference

Elimination round

Semifinal round

Third place playoffs 

|}

Finals

|}

Third Conference

Elimination round

Semifinal round

Third place playoffs 

|}

Finals

|}
Best Import of the Conference: Bobby Parks (Shell)

Awards
 Most Valuable Player: Allan Caidic (Presto)
 Rookie of the Year:  Gerry Esplana (Presto)
 Most Improved Player: Rey Cuenco (Añejo)
 Mythical Five:
Ronnie Magsanoc (Shell)
Paul Alvarez (Alaska)
Benjie Paras (Shell)
Alvin Patrimonio (Purefoods)
Allan Caidic (Presto)
 Mythical Second Team:
Samboy Lim (San Miguel)
Rudy Distrito (Añejo)
Ramon Fernandez (San Miguel)
Elpidio Villamin (Alaska)
Rey Cuenco (Añejo)
 All-Defensive Team:
Abe King (Presto)
Glenn Capacio (Purefoods)
Alvin Teng (San Miguel)
Elpidio Villamin (Alaska)
Chito Loyzaga (Añejo)

Cumulative standings

References